Blue Hill Bay Light is a lighthouse on Green Island in Blue Hill Bay, Maine. It was first established in 1857. The present skeleton structure was built in 1935. It is also known as "Sand Island Light" or Eggemoggin Light".

The original 1857 structure still stands near the current light.  It is a white cylindrical tower with an attached keeper's residence.

References

Lighthouses completed in 1857
Lighthouses completed in 1935
Lighthouses in Hancock County, Maine
1857 establishments in Maine